The National Film Award for Best Popular Film Providing Wholesome Entertainment is one of the National Film Awards presented annually by the Directorate of Film Festivals, India, and was constituted in the year 1975. This is one of the Golden Lotus Awards (Swarna Kamal) given among National Film Awards. It is announced for films produced in a year across the country, in all Indian languages.

Films in the following languages have won the Best Popular Feature Film award: Hindi (29 awards), Telugu (5 awards), Tamil (4 awards), Malayalam (3 awards), Bengali (2 awards), and Kannada (1 award).

With 6 wins, Yash Raj Films is the production house with the most wins. With 5 wins, Yash Chopra is the producer with the most wins, producing most of the company's winning films. He has also directed 4 winning films, the most for any director. Shah Rukh Khan has starred in 7 winning films, the most for any actor in a leading role. Madhuri Dixit and Kajol have each starred in 3 winning films, the most for any actress in a leading role.

Winners

Explanatory notes

References

External links 
 Official Page for Directorate of Film Festivals, India
 National Film Awards Archives

Popular